Bethel College can refer to:
 Bethel College (Kansas)
 Bethel College (Kentucky)
 Bethel University (Indiana), called Bethel College until 2019
 Bethel University (Minnesota), called Bethel College until 2004
 Bethel University (Tennessee), called Bethel College until 2009

See also 
 Beth-El College of Nursing, Colorado